Jacqueshuberia is a genus of legume in the family Fabaceae. 
It contains the following species:
 Jacqueshuberia amplifolia R.S.Cowan
 Jacqueshuberia brevipes
 Jacqueshuberia loretensis R.S.Cowan
 Jacqueshuberia purpurea Ducke	
 Jacqueshuberia pustulata Stergios & P.E. Berry		
 Jacqueshuberia quinquangulata Ducke	
 Jacqueshuberia splendens Stergios & P.E. Berry

References

Caesalpinioideae
Taxonomy articles created by Polbot
Fabaceae genera
Taxa named by Adolpho Ducke